This is a list of actors and actresses who have had roles on the soap opera All My Children. It aired from January 1970 to September 2011 and was revived for five months in 2013. 

The longest serving cast member is Susan Lucci, who played the heroine Erica Kane from January 1970 to the original finale in September 2011.

Cast

See also
 List of All My Children characters

References

Notes

Citations

External links
 Character profiles

All My Children
Cast members